Ralph Lerner (born 1928) is an American political philosopher.

Lerner was born in Chicago, and attended the University of Chicago for his bachelor's, master's, and doctoral degrees in political science. His Ph.D. was advised by Leo Strauss. Lerner later joined the Chicago faculty, where he was named the Benjamin Franklin Professorship until 2003, when he was granted emeritus status.

Books
Naïve Readings: Reveilles Political and Philosophic, University of Chicago Press, 2016
Playing the Fool: Subversive Laughter in Troubled Times, University of Chicago Press, 2009
Maimonides' Empire of Light: Popular Enlightenment in an Age of Belief, University of Chicago Press, 2000
Revolutions Revisited: Two Faces of the Politics of Enlightenment, University of North Carolina Press, 1994
The Thinking Revolutionary: Principle and Practice in the New Republic, Cornell University Press, 1987
The Founders' Constitution, edited with Philip B. Kurland, 1987
Averroes on Plato's 'Republic''', translated by Ralph Lerner, Cornell University Press, 1974Medieval Political Philosophy: A Sourcebook'', Cornell University Press, 1963

References

1928 births
Living people
Writers from Chicago
University of Chicago alumni
University of Chicago faculty
American political philosophers
20th-century American philosophers
21st-century American philosophers
20th-century American male writers
21st-century American male writers
Philosophers from Illinois